Roberto A. Mondragón (born July 27, 1940) is an American politician, musician, and activist. He was the Green Party nominee for governor of New Mexico in 1994, receiving 10.4% of the vote (47,080 votes), and coming third, behind winner Gary Johnson and incumbent Democratic candidate Bruce King. Prior to this, he served as lieutenant governor of New Mexico from 1971 to 1975 and from 1979 to 1983, and as a state representative. He currently serves as special water projects coordinator for the New Mexico state engineer's office and the Interstate Stream Commission. Mondragón later returned to the Democratic Party.

Mondragón recorded two albums in the late 1970s and early 1980s, Que Cante Mondragón and Amigo. One of his early recordings is "Mi Carrito Paseado", a humorous, Spanglish, homage to a less than reliable automobile.

Mondragón is a partner in Aspectos Culturales, a non-profit, Santa Febased firm dedicated to maintaining Hispanic heritage.

 List of minority governors and lieutenant governors in the United States

References

External links

|-

1940 births
Lieutenant Governors of New Mexico
Living people
Democratic Party members of the New Mexico House of Representatives
New Mexico Greens
Politicians from Santa Fe, New Mexico
Musicians from Santa Fe, New Mexico
Hispanic and Latino American state legislators in New Mexico
Hispanic and Latino American musicians
Hispanic and Latino American people in New Mexico politics